Calum Kennedy (born as Malcolm Martin Kennedy; 2 June 1928 – 15 April 2006) was a Scottish singer who performed in both English and Scottish Gaelic.

Biography 
Kennedy was born in Orinsay, a small crofting village on the Isle of Lewis. In 1955, he won a gold medal at the Aberdeen Mòd, singing in Scottish Gaelic.  His first major success outside Scotland was his winning of the World Ballad Championship in Moscow in 1957.

He had his own television program, and was voted "Grampian TV Personality of the Year".  He was married to another Mòd gold medalist, Anne Gillies, who died in 1974.  He wore tartan on his LP covers.

One of his highest performing recordings is titled Islands of Scotland and was recorded for the Decca Ace of Clubs label in the early 1960s. This contains a version of "Land o' Heart's Desire" among other fine songs in English. He is particularly well known for his version of the Gaelic song 'Mo Mhathair'. 

The BBC produced a program in the early 1980s called Calum Kennedy's Commando Course, which documented a disastrous tour around the Scottish Highlands in an old bus.  As more and more of his cast left the tour, a red marker pen was shown erasing them from a promotional poster.  Kennedy was not happy about this program being shown, as he felt it ridiculed him, but it has since gone down as a piece of classic television.  He died at age 77, in Aberdeen Scotland on the 15th of April 2006.

Personal life 

Kennedy's daughter Fiona is also a singer and was for a time co-host with Roy Castle of the long-running BBC children's series Record Breakers. His granddaughter is model and actress Sophie Kennedy Clark. Kennedy owned Leethland House, Glenpatrick Road, and Elderslie which, since a fire, has been left in ruins. Calum had five other daughters besides Fiona: Kirsteen, Morag, Morven, and Deirdre from his first marriage (to Ann Gilles), and Eilidh from his second marriage with Christine Kennedy.

External links
obituary by Brian Wilson
Beltona Record Company  (A Scottish website featuring Calum's recordings)
Biography, Photos and Obituary at About Aberdeen
Calum Kennedy CDs

1928 births
2006 deaths
20th-century Scottish male singers
People from the Isle of Lewis
Scottish Gaelic singers